Ivujivik Airport  is located on the shore of Hudson Bay in Ivujivik, Quebec, Canada.It has a gravel runway 3485' x 100' feet.

Airlines and destinations

References

External links

Certified airports in Nord-du-Québec